Zahra O. Redwood (born c. 1985) was crowned Miss Jamaica Universe on 25 March 2007. She is the first Rastafarian to enter and win a beauty pageant in Jamaica and also the first Rastafarian beauty queen to represent Jamaica internationally in the Miss Universe pageant held in Mexico City on 28 May 2007.

In addition to being the first Rastafarian to be crowned a beauty queen in Jamaica and to represent Jamaica internationally in the Donald Trump/NBC co-owned Miss Universe pageant, Redwood's win was significant because her crowning on 25 March coincided with the same date as the abolition of the transatlantic slave trade. Redwood was voted Most Congenial by her fellow competitors, and also copped the award for Most Aware, bringing her number of awards on the crowning night to three: Winner, Most Congenial and Most Aware.

References

1980s births
Living people
Miss Universe 2007 contestants
Jamaican beauty pageant winners